Sabine Brogle (born 3 May 1965) is a German paralympic air rifle athlete. She competed at the in 1996, 2000, 2004 and 2008 Summer Paralympics. She won two silver medals and three bronze.

Career 
At the 1996 Summer Paralympics in Atlanta, she won a bronze medal in Women's Air Rifle 3x20 SH1, and in Women's Standard Rifle 3x20 SH1.

At the 2000 Summer Paralympics in Sydney, she won a silver medal in Women's Sport Rifle 3x20 SH1, and in Women's Air Rifle Standing SH1.  

At the 2004 Summer Paralympics in Athens, she won a bronze medal in Women's 10 metre air rifle standing SH1. She competed in Women's Sport Rifle 3x20 SH1.

At the 2008 Summer Paralympics, she competed in Women's Sport Rifle 3x20 SH1, and Women's Air Rifle Standing SH1.

She could not compete in 2016 due to a shoulder injury.

She trains with BSG Offenburg; her coach is Rudi Krenn.

References

External links 

 : Bronze medalist Brogle Sabine of Geramany in action during the Women's Air Rifle Standing SH1 competition
 Paralympics 2004, Athen; Silber: Im Yeon KIM / KOR, Gold: Manuela SCHMERMUND / GER, Bronze: Sabine BROGLE / GER

Living people
1965 births
People from Ettenheim
Paralympic shooters of Germany
German female sport shooters
Shooters at the 1996 Summer Paralympics
Shooters at the 2000 Summer Paralympics
Shooters at the 2004 Summer Paralympics
Shooters at the 2008 Summer Paralympics
Medalists at the 1996 Summer Paralympics
Medalists at the 2000 Summer Paralympics
Medalists at the 2004 Summer Paralympics
Paralympic silver medalists for Germany
Paralympic bronze medalists for Germany